Cielos Argentinos is an Aerolíneas Argentinas magazine that incorporates material from Newsweek. It was started in 2009, and belongs to Sergio Szpolski's media group. The magazine is published by Editorial Group Veintitres.

References

2009 establishments in Argentina
Monthly magazines published in Argentina
News magazines published in Argentina
Inflight magazines
Magazines established in 2009
Spanish-language magazines